Nankhari is a Tehsil (town) and a block in Shimla district in the Indian state of Himachal Pradesh. It is about 92.5 km from Shimla and 33 km from Narkanda and NH 5. It consists of 17 Gram panchayat and 102 villages.

Geography
Nankhari is in a mountainous area. It is also a tourist area. The elevation of Nankhari is 2086 m.
Nankhari is 33km far away from Narkanda. It is 92.3 km away from Shimla.

Climate
The average temperature of the year is 15°C, with variations from changes in elevation.

Transport
There is also a helipad in Tharudhaar. It is 20km far away from Narkanda's NH 5. It is 92.3 km far away from Shimla. It is distanced 66 km from Rampur Bushahr.

References

Tehsils of India 
Shimla district